were a samurai kin group which rose to prominence in the Sengoku period and the Edo period. Under the Tokugawa shogunate, the Miyake were hereditary vassals of the Tokugawa clan.  The Miyake were classified as one of the fudai daimyō clans.

History
The clan was descended from the Uda-Genji. 

The Miyake claimed descent from the famed Kamakura period warrior Kojima Takanori, during the 14th century, although this claim is somewhat tenuous.  At the start of the Sengoku period, the Miyake were based in northern Mikawa Province, and were hereditary enemies to the neighboring Matsudaira clan. However, under the leadership of Miyake Masasada, the clan submitted to the Matsudaira in 1558. 

Masasada's son Yasusada (1544–1615) served as a general in the armies of Tokugawa Ieyasu. After the creation of the Tokugawa shogunate, he was appointed daimyō of Koromo Domain, a  10,000 koku fief in Mikawa Province in 1604.  

Miyake Yasunobu (1563–1632) was transferred to the 20,000 koku Ise-Kameyama Domain in 1615.  

The Miyake moved to Tahara Domain (12,000 koku) in southern Mikawa Province in 1664, where they remained until the Meiji Restoration.  

The final daimyō of Tahara Domain, Miyake Yasuyoshi (1831–1895), served as guji to the Kunōzan Tōshō-gū under the Meiji government.  He was made a viscount (shishaku) in the kazoku peerage system.

Notes

Japanese clans